Land loss is the term typically used to refer to the conversion of coastal land to open water by natural processes and human activities. The term land loss includes coastal erosion. It is a much broader term than coastal erosion because land loss also includes land converted to open water around the edges of estuaries and interior bays and lakes and by subsidence of coastal plain wetlands. The most important causes of land loss in coastal plains are erosion, inadequate sediment supply to beaches and wetlands, subsidence, and global sea level rise. The mixture of processes responsible for most of the land loss will vary according to the specific part of a coastal plain being examined. The definition of land loss does not include the loss of coastal lands to agricultural use, urbanization, or other development.

Wetland loss
Although seemingly related, wetland loss, is defined differently than land loss. Commonly, wetland loss is defined as the conversion of vegetated wetlands into either uplands or drained areas, unvegetated wetlands (e.g., mudflats), or (submerged habitats (open water). According to this, and similar definitions, wetland loss includes both land loss and land consumption as components of it. In historic times, both wetland and land loss typically are the result of a varying, often controversial mixture of natural and anthropogenic factors. There are other definitions of wetland loss commonly used. For example, some researchers defined wetland loss as "the substantial removal of wetland from its ecologic role under natural conditions."

Land loss mechanisms
The main causes of land loss are coastal erosion, inadequate sediment supply, subsidence, and sea level rise. Coastal erosion occurs when the rate of sediment deposition is slower than the rate of sediment removal by coastal currents. The most important cause of decreased rates of sediment deposition is the construction of dams and reservoirs although sediment control and conservation programs can also play a role. Once a dam is constructed, sediment that previously traveled freely in the river is trapped in the reservoir. Decreased sediment loads downstream of the dam prevent sediment from replenishing the delta. Subsidence is the compaction of soil resulting in a lower elevation. Subsidence can occur when oil, gas, or groundwater are extracted. These substances hold the land up until they are removed. Compaction due to heavy urban infrastructure also occurs. Sea level rise due to climate change is another threat to coastal land.

Land loss and deltas 

Because of a highly variable combination of sea level rise, sediment starvation, coastal erosion, wetland deterioration, subsidence, and various human activities, land loss within delta plains is a significant global problem. The large delta plains of the world, including the Danube, Ganges, Brahmaputra, Indus, Mahanadi, Mangoky, McKenzie, Mississippi, Niger, Nile, Shatt el Arab, Volga, Yellow, Yukon, and Zambezi deltas, have all suffered significant land loss as the result of either coastal erosion, internal conversion of wetlands to open water, or a combination of both. The factors contributing to land loss in the deltas below are not including direct conversion of delta wetlands into agricultural or urban land, although this is happening concurrently in many of them.

 The Danube Delta is located in Romania and Ukraine where the Danube River enters into the Black Sea. The loss of this delta is primarily due to sediment starvation caused by dams along the river. After the construction of the two largest of these dams, the Iron Gates dams, sediment in the river decreased by 60% - 70%.

 The Ganges Delta forms where the combined waters of the Ganges and Brahmaputra rivers enter the Bay of Bengal. The delta is damaged by sediment starvation due to the construction of many upstream dams. The location is also susceptible to sea level rise with the majority of the delta being below 5 m in elevation.

 The Indus River Delta forms as the Indus River enters the Arabian Sea in India and Pakistan. The construction of barrages and reservoirs for irrigation has drastically reduced the flow of the Indus and its ability to carry sediment.

 The Mahanadi River Delta forms where the Mahanadi, Brahmani, and Baitarini rivers enter into the Bay of Bengal on the east coast of India. Similar to the Ganges River Delta, significant amounts of the Mahanadi Delta are below 5 m in elevation and are threatened by sea level rise. Dams for irrigation and for flood control including the Hirakud Dam contribute to sediment starvation. 65% of the coastline is currently facing erosion.

 The Mangoky River Delta is formed by the Mangoky River draining into the Mozambique Channel off the west coast of Madagascar. Mangrove forests face deforestation by coastal fishermen and inland farmers, resulting in an increase in coastal erosion.

 The Mackenzie River Delta is formed by the Mackenzie River in Canada flowing north into the Arctic Ocean. Rising sea level combined with melting of permafrost near the permafrost table results in land subsidence.

 For the Mississippi River Delta see Mississippi River Delta page.

 The Niger Delta is formed by the Niger River entering into the Gulf of Guinea on the west coast of Africa. Dams, erosion, and subsidence due to wetland conversion are the major contributing factors to loss of the delta.

 The Nile River Delta is formed by the Nile River flowing north through Egypt and entering into the Mediterranean Sea. The primary reasons for Nile Delta loss is due to sediment entrapment behind the Aswan dams. Secondary reasons include subsidence, sea level rise, and strong coastal currents.

 The Shatt al-Arab River Delta is formed when the Shatt al-Arab River flows into the Persian Gulf. The river itself is formed by the joining of the Tigris and Euphrates rivers. A decrease in freshwater entering the river due to irrigation and thus a decrease in sediment load has increased coastal erosion of the delta. Hydraulic structures and sea level rise are also playing a role in the loss of the delta.

 The Volga Delta is formed when the Volga River enters into the Caspian Sea in Russia. It has actually gained land with the drop in level of the Caspian Sea. In the last twenty years as the water level has risen again, the delta has still not experienced any loss. As the terms are defined above, the delta has experience wetland loss but not land loss.

 The Yellow River Delta is formed as the Yellow River flows into the Yellow Sea. The Yellow River flows through the Loess Plateau and carries large amounts of sediment. Until 1998, the Yellow River Delta was expanding, but it has been decreasing ever since. Many dams have been constructed on the Yellow River and are starving the coastline of sediment.

 The Yukon River Delta is formed when the Yukon and Kuskokwim rivers enter into the Bering Sea in Alaska. The delta is threatened by sea level rise; an increase of 0.5 m would result in increased erosion due to higher tides. Inactive floodplains where tides and sedimentation rates are not in equilibrium are most at risk.

 The Zambezi River Delta is formed when the Zambezi River enters the Mozambique Channel off of the east coast of Africa. The construction of the Kariba Dam, the Cahora Bassa Dam, and dykes have altered natural flooding and sediment deposition. The delta coast is in a state of erosion due to sediment starvation and a slowly rising sea level.

See also 
Coastal erosion in Louisiana
Wetlands of Louisiana

References

Geomorphology
Coastal erosion
Sedimentology